is a Japanese lightweight rower. He competed at the 1992 (coxless pair) and 1996 Olympics (lightweight coxless four). He won a gold medal at the 2000 World Rowing Championships in Zagreb with the lightweight men's quadruple scull.

References

1972 births
Living people
Japanese male rowers
World Rowing Championships medalists for Japan
Olympic rowers of Japan
Rowers at the 1992 Summer Olympics
Rowers at the 1996 Summer Olympics
Asian Games medalists in rowing
Rowers at the 1998 Asian Games
Rowers at the 2002 Asian Games
Asian Games silver medalists for Japan
Medalists at the 1998 Asian Games
Medalists at the 2002 Asian Games